MTB BANK is a commercial bank in Ukraine, which was founded on 5 November 1993, as an open joint stock company MARFIN BANK. MARFIN BANK changed owners in June 2017. Mykhailo Partikevych and Igor Zgurov (since 2017), and Hamed Alihani (since 2018) are the ultimate beneficial owners of the bank now.

The bank was rebranded and was renamed as public joint stock company MTB BANK in 2017. License of the National Bank of Ukraine No.66 dated 19 March 2018. The authorized capital of MTB BANK PJSC is UAH 635 million. MTB BANK is the authorized bank of the Pension Fund of Ukraine. MTB BANK has its headquarters in Odesa, in southern Ukraine.

License of the National Bank of Ukraine No.66 dated 19 March 2018. The equity of MTB BANK PJSC is ₴953 million. The assets of MTB BANK are ₴11,097 billion.

MTB BANK is the authorized bank of the Pension Fund of Ukraine.

History

The Bank was established by the decision of the Constituent Assembly on 15 September 1993 (Protocol No.1) and was registered by the National Bank of Ukraine on 5 November 1993, under No. 207 as the interregional joint stock bank MiDO.

Name of the interregional joint stock bank MiDO was changed into the joint stock commercial bank MORTORGBANK at the extraordinary general meeting of Shareholders (Protocol No. 6 dated 10 November 1994).

Name of the Joint Stock Commercial Bank MORTORGBANK was changed into the joint stock commercial bank MARINE TRANSPORT BANK at the General Meeting of Shareholders of the Bank (Protocol No. 9 dated 19 January 1996).

Name of the Joint Stock Commercial Bank MARINE TRANSPORT BANK was changed into the open joint stock company MARINE TRANSPORT BANK at the general meeting of shareholders of the bank (Protocol No. 20 dated 26 October 2002).

Name and type of the open joint stock company MARINE TRANSPORT BANK was changed into the public joint stock company MARFIN BANK at the General Meeting of Shareholders (Protocol No. 36 dated 8 July 2010).

According to the decision of the extraordinary general meeting of shareholders (Protocol No. 56 dated 28 December 2017), the name of the public joint stock company MARFIN BANK was changed into a public joint stock company, MTB BANK.

Such changes did not affect the organizational and legal form of management of the bank and did not require the termination of the bank as a joint stock company according to the legislation of Ukraine that was in force on the date of the above changes.

Public joint stock company MTB BANK is a legal successor of all rights and obligations of public joint stock company MARFIN BANK, Open Joint Stock Company MARINE TRANSPORT BANK, joint stock commercial bank MARINE TRANSPORT BANK, joint stock commercial bank MORTORGBANK and interregional joint stock bank MiDO.

Public joint stock company MTB BANK is the legal successor of all property, cash, rights and obligations of the public joint stock company COMMERCIAL BANK "Center", registered by the National Bank of Ukraine on 14 June 2010, for No. 334, due to reorganization of COMMERCIAL BANK "Center" by joining the public joint stock company MTB BANK. Permission for reorganization by simplified procedure was given by the National Bank of Ukraine (Order of the National Bank of Ukraine No.477 10 August 2018).

Membership in interbank associations
Public joint stock company MTB BANK is a member/participant of interbank associations, stock exchanges, associations and international organizations:
 Deposit Guarantee Fund for Individuals.
 International payment system MasterCard Worldwide (affiliate member).
 International payment system Visa International Inc. (associate member).
 UnionPay International.
 Ukrainian Interbank Association of Payment Systems Members.
 Partner of Western Union.
 Ukrainian Stock Traders Association.
 Professional Association of Capital Markets and Derivatives.
"Settlement Center" PJSC.
 National Depository of Ukraine.
 Society for Worldwide Interbank Financial Telecommunication.
 Thomson Reuters.
 Authorized Bank of the Pension Fund of Ukraine.
 Independent Association of the Banks of Ukraine.

Deposit rating
MTB BANK PJSC has maintained high positions of deposit and credit ratings assigned by the specialized independent rating agency Credit-Rating for several years.

The rating of bank deposits’ reliability is at the level of "5" (the highest level). MTB BANK, PJSC received it on 24 February 2009. Since then, the monthly rating is confirmed at the same level.
The ratings are constantly updated. This rating is the highest assessment of the bank deposits’ reliability. It was developed to protect depositors and to increase their awareness of banking institution's reliability.
The Bank does not use refinancing of the National Bank of Ukraine (including stabilization loans).

Credit rating
The long-term credit rating of MTB BANK PJSC was assigned on 29 May 2007. Over the years, the bank's credit rating has risen to "uaAA". The forecast is stable. 
A [credit rating] is an assessment of a borrower's financial condition and is an independent opinion of the rating agency on its credit worthiness.
This rating is assigned according to the National Rating Scale.

Sponsorship and philanthropy
MTB BANK PJSC has been the premium partner of the International [Music Festival] Odessa Classics and the sponsor of the annual art festival Velvet Season at the [Odessa Opera |Odessa Opera and Ballet Theater] for many years.

MTB BANK PJSC also sponsors the annual Black Sea Ports Cup and Black Sea Cup [regatta |regattas], professional international tennis tournaments under the auspices of the [ITF].

It provides financial support to the Monsters Corporation [charity organization] and participates in fighting COVID-19 projects.

Awards and honors

2009 – Bank with a high level of business openness and transparency (First National Competition Bank of the Year 2009 according to the magazine [Banker]).

2011 – European Quality Award of the International Socratic Committee of the European Business Assembly (Oxford, UK).

2016 – Bank – a reliable partner in the world of business VIII All-Ukrainian competition BANK OF THE YEAR – 2016.

References

Links
 Website of the National Bank of Ukraine
 Official site of PJSC MTB BANK
 Financial Club
 Banker Online magazine

Banks of Ukraine
Companies based in Odesa
Ukrainian brands
Ukrainian companies established in 1993
Banks established in 1993